Lisa Waltz is an American actress who has had roles in many television shows and who played Nora in the film adaptation of Brighton Beach Memoirs.

Personal life
Waltz was born and raised in Limerick, Pennsylvania, the daughter of Bobby and the late Bill Waltz, owners of Waltz Golf Farm.  She attended Spring-Ford Area High School in Royersford, Pennsylvania, and Carnegie-Mellon University. She is married to Dr. Mark Morocco.

Career
She has appeared in several television series, including My So-Called Life, Boston Legal, CSI: Miami, Frasier, Inconceivable, Side Order of Life, Ask Harriet, The Young and the Restless, The Agency, The X-Files, Castle and 90210.

Waltz played Melinda Bauer, the mother of Kiefer Bauer and wife to Warren Bauer, on General Hospital in 2010.

She also played Suzanne on Fear the Walking Dead: Flight 462.

Filmography

Film

Television

References

External links

Interview with Patch.com

20th-century American actresses
21st-century American actresses
Actresses from California
American film actresses
American television actresses
Living people
Carnegie Mellon University College of Fine Arts alumni
1961 births